{{Infobox food
| name            = Chutney
| image           = Chutneykarnataka.jpg
| caption         = Different types of chutneys from Bangalore, India
| alternate_name  = chammanthi, chatney, chatni, satni, upsecanam, thuvayal', aachar, pacchadi| place_of_origin         = Indian subcontinent
| region          = South Asia, Caribbean, and parts of Africa, Fiji
| associated_cuisine = Afghanistan, Bangladesh, Fiji, Guyana, India, Mauritius, Nepal, Pakistan, South Africa, Sri Lanka, Suriname, Trinidad and Tobago, United Kingdom
| main_ingredient = Vegetables, fruits, salt, spices, and herbs. The nearest bowl is a dahi chutney, based on yoghurt (dahi).
}}
thumb|upright|Variety of chutneys served with the main dish

A chutney ( romanised: chatni  romanised: chatnee  romanised: chatnee) is a spread typically associated with cuisines of the Indian subcontinent. Chutneys are made in a wide variety of forms, such as a tomato relish, a ground peanut garnish, yogurt or curd, cucumber, spicy coconut, spicy onion or mint dipping sauce.

A common variant in Anglo-Indian cuisine uses a tart fruit such as sharp apples, rhubarb or damson pickle made milder by an equal weight of sugar (usually demerara, turbinado or brown sugar to replace jaggery in some Indian sweet chutneys). Vinegar was added to the recipe for English-style chutney that traditionally aims to give a long shelf life so that autumn fruit can be preserved for use throughout the year (as are jams, jellies and pickles) or to be sold as a commercial product. Indian pickles use mustard oil as a pickling agent, but Anglo-Indian style chutney uses malt or cider vinegar which produces a milder product. In western cuisine, chutney is often eaten with hard cheese or with cold meats and fowl, typically in cold pub lunches.

 Etymology 
The word chutney derives from Hindi चटनी  chaṭnī, deriving from चाटना chāṭnā 'to lick' or 'to eat with appetite'. In India, chutney refers to fresh and pickled preparations indiscriminately; however, several Indian languages use the word for fresh preparations only.

Overview
 
In India, chutneys can be either made alongside pickles that are matured in the sun for up to two weeks and kept up to a year or, more commonly, are freshly made from fresh ingredients that can be kept a couple of days or a week in the refrigerator.

In Tamil Nadu, thogayal or thuvayal (Tamil) are preparations similar to chutney but with a pasty consistency. In Andhra Pradesh it is also called pacchadi. In Kerala it is also called chammanthi and in Telangana it is called tokku or also pacchadi. Thengai chutney, a coconut-based chutney is the one being referred when only 'chutney' is said.

Medicinal plants that are believed to have a beneficial effect are sometimes made into chutneys, for example pirandai thuvayal or ridged gourd chutney (peerkangai thuvayal or beerakaaya tokku).

Bitter gourd can also serve as a base for a chutney which is like a relish or, alternatively as a dried powder.

Occasionally, chutneys that contrast in taste and colour can be served together—a favourite combination being a green mint and chili chutney with a contrasting sweet brown tamarind and date chutney.

Chutneys may be ground with a mortar and pestle or an ammikkal (Tamil). Spices are added and ground, usually in a particular order; the wet paste thus made is sautéed in vegetable oil, usually gingelly (sesame) or peanut oil. Electric blenders or food processors can be used as labour-saving alternatives to the stone grinding technique.

Western-style chutneys are usually fruit, vinegar, and sugar cooked down to a reduction, with added flavourings. These may include sugar, salt, garlic, tamarind, onion or ginger. Western-style chutneys originated from Anglo-Indians at the time of the British Raj recreated Indian chutneys using English orchard fruits—sour cooking apples and rhubarb, for example. They would often contain dried fruit: raisins, currants, and sultanas.

They were a way to use a glut of ripened fruit and preserving techniques were similar to sweet fruit preserves using approximately an equal weight of fruit and sugar, the vinegar and sugar acting as preservatives.

South Indian chutney powders are made from roasted dried lentils to be sprinkled on idlis and dosas. Peanut chutneys can be made wet or as a dry powder.

Spices commonly used in chutneys include fenugreek, coriander, cumin, and asafoetida (hing). Other prominent ingredients and combinations include coriander, capsicum, mint (coriander and mint chutneys are often called हरा hara chutney, Hindi for "green"), Tamarind or imli (often called meethi chutney, as मिठाई meethi in Hindi means "sweet"), sooth (or saunth, made with dates and ginger), coconut, onion, prune, tomato, red chili, green chili, mango, lime (made from whole, unripe limes), garlic, coconut, peanut, dahi (yogurt), green tomato, dhaniya pudina (cilantro and mint), peanut (shengdana chutney in Marathi), ginger, red chili powder, tomato onion chutney, cilantro, mint coconut chutney, and apricot.

Major Grey's Chutney is a type of sweet and spicy chutney popular in the United States. The recipe was reportedly created by a 19th-century British Army officer of the same name (likely apocryphal) who presumably had resided for a period of time in the Raj. Its characteristic ingredients are mango, raisins, vinegar, lime juice, onion, tamarind extract, sweetening and spices. Several companies produce a Major Grey's Chutney, in India, the UK and the US.

 History 

Similar in preparation and usage to a pickle, simple spiced chutneys can be dated to 500 BC. Originating in South Asia, this method of preserving food was subsequently adopted by the Romans and British thanks to their encounters and contacts with the Indian subcontinent. As greater imports of foreign and varied foods increased into northern Europe, chutney fell out of favour in Britain. This combined with a greater ability to refrigerate fresh foods and an increasing number of glasshouses meant the British consumption of chutney and pickle were relegated to army usage and individuals residing in South Asia. Chutney became resurgently popular in England around the 1780s as an appetizer.

Diego Álvarez Chanca brought back chili peppers from the Americas to Spain in 1493. He had sailed with Columbus. After discovering their medicinal properties, Chanca developed a chutney to administer them. In the early 17th century, officials of the East India Company on the Indian subcontinent subsisted on preserved foodstuffs such as lime pickles, chutneys and marmalades. (Marmalades proved unpopular due to their sweetness. They were also rare due to a lack of available sugar.) Beginning in the 17th century, fruit chutneys were shipped to various European countries as luxury goods. These imitations were called "mangoed" fruits or vegetables, the word 'chutney' being associated with the working class in these countries.

Major Grey's Chutney is thought to have been developed by a British officer who had travelled to the Indian subcontinent. The formula was eventually sold to Crosse and Blackwell, a major British food manufacturer, probably in the early 1800s. In the 19th century, types of chutney like Major Grey's or Bengal Club that catered to western tastes were shipped to Europe from South Asia. Generally, these chutneys are fruit, vinegar, and sugar cooked down to a reduction.

 By regions of India 

 See also 

  
 
 
  used similarly to dry chutney
  commonly used as relish for Japanese curry
 
 
 
 

 
 
 
 

  with chutneys unique to the UK and elsewhere
 

 References 

 Further reading 
 Weaver, William Woys. "Chutney". Encyclopedia of Food and Culture. Ed. Solomon H. Katz. Vol. 1. New York: Charles Scribner's Sons, 2003. 417–418. 3 vols.  .
 Dahiya, Ashish. Food of Haryana: The Great Chutneys'' Vol. 1. India. .
 Food Safety in Production of Chutney, Pickles. Jams, Oils – UK

External links 

 Chutney Origins. Foodreference.com.

 
Ancient dishes
Sri Lankan cuisine
Indian condiments
South Asian cuisine
Vegetarian dishes of India
Pakistani condiments
Bangladeshi condiments
Trinidad and Tobago cuisine